Facci is an Italian surname. Notable people with the surname include:

Loris Facci (born 1983), Italian swimmer
Mauro Facci (born 1982), Italian cyclist
Mayr Facci (1927–2015), Brazilian basketball player

See also
Fauci (surname)

Italian-language surnames